The Lotiga, also known as the Okara, were an indigenous Australian people of the Cape York Peninsula of North Queensland.

Country

People
Ursula McConnel suggested that the Okara tribe mentioned by Lauriston Sharp, as belonging to the Jathaikana type of social organization, might be the same as the Lotiga. Norman Tindale equated the two on the basis of McConnel's provisory conjecture.

Alternative names
 Okara.(?)
 Oharra.

Notes

Citations

Sources

Aboriginal peoples of Queensland